Goblin Cock is an American heavy metal band from San Diego, California, United States, started by Rob Crow of the band Pinback. Musically, they play a form of doom metal/drone metal with rather unusual lyrical subjects, including pop culture songs about the films Godzilla's Revenge, Billy Jack, and the Snuffleupagus from the TV show Sesame Street. All members of the band have taken on stage names. The band is currently signed to Joyful Noise Recordings and has released two albums on the Absolutely Kosher record label. They went on tour for the first time in 2006 and played at the 20th annual South by Southwest Music Festival in Austin, TX.  They also performed on September 15, 2005, at the College Music Journal's annual music festival.

Their first album, Bagged and Boarded, was nominated for a 2006 PLUG award for Metal Album of the Year. Their music video for the track "Stumped" directed by  Matt Hoyt was also nominated for music Music Video of the Year at the 2006 PLUG Independent Music Awards as well.   The album cover  is a literal depiction of the group's name, which could also be considered a double entendre.  The lyrics in the liner notes are written in runes.

Members
 Lord Phallus (Rob Crow) - Guitar and Vocals
 Lick Myheart - Guitar
 Tinnitus Island - Bass guitar
 Mylar Grinninstein - Drums

Discography
 Bagged and Boarded (2005 Absolutely Kosher Records)
 Come with Me If You Want to Live! (2008 Robcore Records)
 Necronomidonkeykongimicon (2016 Joyful Noise Recordings)
Roses on the Piano (2018 Joyful Noise Recordings)

References

External links
Goblin Cock at Facebook
Goblin Cock page at Myspace
Goblin Cock - Necronomidonkeykongimicon at Joyful Noise Recordings

American doom metal musical groups
Heavy metal musical groups from California
Drone metal musical groups
American stoner rock musical groups
Musical groups from San Diego
Joyful Noise Recordings artists